Henriett Koósz (born 14 February 1980 in Kőszeg) is an Austrian wheelchair tennis player and para-badminton player. As a member of the Austrian Paralympic wheelchair tennis team, she competed at the 2012 Paralympics in London. In 2016, she represented Austria in para-badminton at the Austrian Open. 

In 2013, she was awarded the MiA award by the Austrian Federal Sports Organisation.

Early life and career
Koósz was born in Hungary. She has been paraplegic since a car accident in October 1997. She started without previous knowledge with wheelchair tennis at the age of 24. In December 2005, she started her participation in international and national tournaments. 

In 2007, she played in the B squad and in 2010 was taken into the A-squad of the Austrian national wheelchair tennis team. Koósz won the 2009 national championship in women's doubles with her partner Anette Baldauf for the first time, and a year later she became national champion in women's singles.

Wheelchair tennis statistics

ITF Wheelchair Tennis Tour

Singles

Doubles

Para-badminton statistics

World Championships 
Women's singles

Mixed doubles

European Championships 
Women's singles

References

External links

 
 
 
 Facebook-Fanpage

1980 births
Living people
Paralympic wheelchair tennis players of Austria
Wheelchair tennis players at the 2012 Summer Paralympics
Hungarian emigrants to Austria
People from Kőszeg
People with paraplegia
Austrian para-badminton players
Austrian female tennis players